Debra S. Wada is an American government official who served as Assistant Secretary of the Army (Manpower and Reserve Affairs) during the Obama administration.

Education 
Wada earned a Bachelor of Arts degree in economics and political science from Drake University and a diploma from the United States Naval War College.

Career 
Wada worked in United States House of Representatives for more than 25 years, including as a professional staff member for the House Armed Services Committee. During her time on the committee, she served as the deputy staff director.

On May 1, 2014 President Obama announced his intent to nominate Wada as the Assistant Secretary of the Army (Manpower and Reserve Affairs). She was later confirmed by a voice vote in the Senate on September 17, 2014. .

Previously, Wada served as vice chair of the National Commission on Military, National, and Public Service. The commission is a congressionally-established body that was directed to assess and recommend ways to increase the number of Americans who serve in military, national and public sectors, as well as determine future requirements for the Selective Service System.

Additionally, Wada served on President Joe Biden’s agency review team for the Department of Defense.

References 

Living people
Drake University alumni
Obama administration personnel
United States Department of the Army officials
Year of birth missing (living people)